Jonathan Goodwin may refer to:
Jonathan Goodwin (escapologist) (born 1980), British TV escapologist
Jonathan Goodwin (American football) (born 1978), American football center
Jonathan Goodwin (entrepreneur), founding partner of Lepe Partners

See also
John Goodwin (disambiguation)
Jon Goodwin (disambiguation)